The 1902 Wisconsin Badgers football team represented the University of Wisconsin in the 1902 Western Conference football season. Led by seventh-year head coach Philip King, the Badgers compiled an overall record of 6–3 with a mark of 1–3 in conference play, placing sixth in the Western Conference. The team's captain was William Juneau.

Schedule

References

Wisconsin
Wisconsin Badgers football seasons
Wisconsin Badgers football